TV: 2000 is a 1982 anthology of science fiction short-stories revolving around television and its implications. Its editors are Isaac Asimov, Charles G. Waugh, and Martin H. Greenberg.

Contents

Part I: The Control of TV

Part II: The Content of TV

Part III: The Consequences of TV

1982 books
Martin H. Greenberg anthologies